Theobald Butler was the illegitimate son of Sir James Butler of Polestown and his wife Sabh Kavanagh. He was the elder brother of Piers Butler, 8th Earl of Ormond and of Edmond Butler of Polestown.

Issue
 Eleanor Butler, married Richard Butler, 1st Viscount Mountgarret

See also
 Butler dynasty

Sources
 Some corrections and additions to The Complete Peerage, http://www.medievalgenealogy.org.uk/, II:448.

Theobald
15th-century Irish people